Jodłówka  (Yodlivka) is a village in the administrative district of Gmina Pruchnik, within Jarosław County, Subcarpathian Voivodeship, in south-eastern Poland.

The village has a population of 1,822.

References

Villages in Jarosław County